Capromys is a genus of rodents that contains Desmarest's hutia, Garrido's hutia, and several recently extinct species, mainly from Cuba, although one extinct subspecies of Desmarest's hutia is known from Grand Cayman.

Species
The following species are considered valid per Borroto-Páez (2012) and the American Society of Mammalogists:

Capromys garridoi (Garrido's hutia, possibly extinct)
Capromys pilorides (Desmarest's hutia or Cuban hutia)
C. p. ciprianoi
C. p. doceleguas
C. p. gundlachianus
†C. p. lewisi
C. p. pilorides
C. p. relictus
†Capromys acevedo
†Capromys latus

Capromys arredondoi and Capromys pappus are now synonymous with the Cuban hutia. Capromys antiquus  is synonymous with C. acevedo. Capromys robustus  is synonymous with C. latus.

References

Rodent genera
Hutias
Taxa named by Anselme Gaëtan Desmarest